Gabriel Albejante Pitta (born 12 May 1980) is a Brazilian former professional tennis player.

Pitta, a native of Mogi Mirim, São Paulo, had a best singles world ranking of 625 and a career high of 419 in doubles. He won seven ITF Futures doubles titles. In 2004 he participated in a Davis Cup tie against Peru in the midst of a player boycott. The first choice team was unavailable due to a Gustavo Kuerten-led boycott over alleged mismanagement from the head of the Brazilian Tennis Confederation. As a result, Pitta was one of the reserve players called up and faced Peru's best player Luis Horna in singles, losing in three sets. He also played and lost in the doubles rubber.

ITF Futures finals

Singles: 3 (0–3)

Doubles: 18 (7–11)

See also
List of Brazil Davis Cup team representatives

References

External links
 
 
 

1980 births
Living people
Brazilian male tennis players
Sportspeople from São Paulo (state)
21st-century Brazilian people
People from Mogi Mirim